Stolen Horse International, Inc., also referred to as NetPosse or SHI,  is an organization founded to assist horse owners with recovering horses lost during theft.  Their website states their mission is to provide a comprehensive theft awareness program to all facets of the horse industry and offer educational opportunities for horse enthusiasts of all types and across all disciplines. The organization which started in 1997, has broaden its reach in the equine community to missing, lost and found, runaways and much more. 

This is the lost and found "go to" organization in the equine industry.

Stolen Horse International, Inc. is a registered 501(c)(3) non-profit.

Activities

Stolen horses
The organization seeks primarily to aid in the search for stolen and missing horses.  According to statistics, thousands of horses are stolen each year in the United States.

Horses constitute an easy source of cash for thieves.  They can be quickly sold at saleyards, making it difficult to track the thief.  Horses in areas that are not well supervised are at highest risk.  Horses can also be stolen through civil theft such as bad leases, family or friend disputes, or through divorce.  Once stolen, the horses can end up going to slaughter, resold at auction, or end up as riding mounts.  The more times they are resold, the harder it is to find a stolen horse.  Thieves are only interested in a short-term profit and do not care about where the horse ends up.

Stolen tack and trailers
Stolen Horse International also aid owners in finding stolen equipment including tack and trailers.  Tack is typically difficult to track, especially if not engraved with some identification number.  Stolen tack is typically resold at auction (including online auctions such as E-Bay), feed and tack stores, or at pawn shops.  Organizations such as SHI assist with recovering tack by sending notifications out to thousands of recipients.

Horse trailers are an easy target for thieves.  Despite having a unique VIN and requiring a title, thieves have figured ways to forge titles so they can resell the trailer and not be tracked.  Once a trailer is stolen, notifications and fliers can be sent out by SHI to help make potential buyers aware of the stolen trailer.

Missing owners
Stolen Horse International, Inc.also assists owners with recovering horses whose owners are unknown. The organization excepts some "civil thefts" since many horses disappear in this manner.  Such events typically occur during natural disasters such as wildfires and hurricanes.  They assisted with reuniting pet owners with their pets after Hurricane Katrina and many other disasters.

Education
A book titled Horse Theft. Been There—Done That was released by Stolen Horse International, Inc., to inform horse owners about how to protect their horses from theft.  The organization also travels to various expositions, clinics and groups across the United States to educate horse owners on how to prevent and deal with all missing horse situations and equine identification.

Seeking justice
Stolen Horse International, Inc., also works closely with law enforcement personnel to aid in the apprehension of horse thieves, as well as search and recovery of horses.  Many thieves have been apprehended after the group has assisted with the recovery of stolen horses.

Volunteers
The work performed by Stolen Horse International, Inc., is done by thousands of volunteers which receive and distribute fliers, usually sent electronically via e-mail or fax.  Their electronic mailing list, titled the NetPosse Alert Network, can be accessed freely by anyone with Internet access.  Because the group is a non-profit, volunteer work is important since their funding is limited.

History
Stolen Horse International, Inc.,was founded by Debi Metcalfe with the help of her husband Harold.  Harold's mare, Idaho, was stolen September 26, 1997.  Idaho was eventually recovered after 51 weeks.  After the recovery, Mrs. Metcalfe started Stolen Horse International, Inc., commonly known as NetPosse.com, to aid other owners with the recovery of their stolen horses.

See also
 Bentonville Anti-Horse Thief Society
 Horse theft
 Stolen Horse International, Inc., aka NetPosse.com
 NetPosse.com

References

External links 
 Official Site for Stolen Horse International, Inc.
 IDAHO Alert Network Mailing List

Equestrian organizations